Night of the Blade is the second studio album released by the British heavy metal band Tokyo Blade on Powerstation Records in 1984. It is the first Tokyo Blade album with Vicki James Wright (Vic Wright) on vocals. He replaced Alan Marsh when the vocal tracks for the album were already completed, forcing him to re-record the lead vocals in a very short time. Marsh's backing vocals remain on the album except on two tracks ("Lightning Strikes" and "Rock Me to the Limit"), which were recorded after he left the band. The original vocal recordings by Alan Marsh were released in 1998 in the album re-issue Night of the Blade... The Night Before.

The album was also remastered and reissued in 1997, along with the album Tokyo Blade, by High Vaultage Records, the reissue edition containing the tracks of two EPs released in 1984 and 1985.

Track listing
Side one
"Someone to Love" (Andy Boulton, Alan Marsh) – 3:41
"Night of the Blade" (Boulton, Marsh) – 4:01
"Rock Me to the Limit" (Boulton, Marsh, Vicki James Wright) – 5:54
"Warrior of the Rising Sun" (Boulton, Marsh) – 4:25

Side two
"Unleash the Beast" (Boulton, Marsh) – 4:32
"Love Struck" (Boulton, Marsh, John Wiggins) – 3:43
"Dead of the Night" (Boulton, Marsh, Wiggins) – 3:45
"Lightning Strikes (Straight Through the Heart)" (Boulton, Marsh, Wright) – 4:21

1997 remastered edition bonus tracks
"Fever" – 3:28
"Attack Attack" – 3:37
"Madam Guillotine" – 4:43
"Breakout" – 3:44
"Monkey's Blood" – 3:43
"Schoolhouse Is Burning" – 3:59
"Shadows of Insanity" – 5:01
"Jezzabell" – 3:20

Personnel

Tokyo Blade
 Vicki James Wright – lead vocals
 Andy Boulton – lead guitar, backing vocals
 John Wiggins – lead guitar
 Andy Wrighton – bass guitar, backing vocals
 Steve Pierce – drums

Production
 Roy Neave – producer
 Ralph Jezzard – engineer
 Tony Spath – mixing

References

1984 albums
Tokyo Blade albums
Combat Records albums
Roadrunner Records albums